Antonio Ponticorona was a Roman Catholic prelate who served as Bishop of Agrigento (1445–1451) and  Bishop of Cefalu (1422–1445).

Biography
Antonio Ponticorona was ordained a priest in the Order of Preachers.
In 1442, he was appointed by Pope Eugene IV as Bishop of Cefalu. 
On 23 July 1445, he was appointed by Pope Eugene IV as Bishop of Agrigento. 
He served as Bishop of Agrigento until his death in 1451.

References

External links and additional sources
 (for Chronology of Bishops) 
 (for Chronology of Bishops) 
 (for Chronology of Bishops) 
 (for Chronology of Bishops) 

15th-century Roman Catholic bishops in Sicily
Bishops appointed by Pope Eugene IV
Dominican bishops
1451 deaths